Comitas bilix is an extinct species of sea snail, a marine gastropod mollusc in the family Pseudomelatomidae, the turrids and allies.

Description

Distribution
This marine species is endemic to New Zealand. Fossils have been found in Tertiary strata of the Gisborne District

References

 Marwick, John. The Tertiary Mollusca of the Gisborne District. Department of Scientific and Industrial Research, Geological Survey Branch, 1931.
 Maxwell, P.A. (2009). Cenozoic Mollusca. pp 232–254 in Gordon, D.P. (ed.) New Zealand inventory of biodiversity. Volume one. Kingdom Animalia: Radiata, Lophotrochozoa, Deuterostomia. Canterbury University Press, Christchurch.

External links
 

bilix
Gastropods described in 1931
Gastropods of New Zealand